Green Gables may refer to:

Green Gables (Melbourne, Florida), a historic home
Green Gables (Palo Alto, California), a 1950s subdivision
Mortimer Fleishhacker House in Woodside, California, also called Green Gables
Green Gables (Prince Edward Island), a 19th-century farmhouse, setting of the novel Anne of Green Gables
Green Gables Croquet Club, Spring Lake, New Jersey
Needs Convenience, a chain of convenience stores formerly known as "Green Gables"

See also

 Anne of Green Gables, a 1908 novel by Lucy Maud Montgomery set on Prince Edward Island